Shotstar was a rock band from Tucson, Arizona.

History

Inspired by 60s classic rock as well as the power pop of the '70s and '90s, singer/guitarist Andrew Taillole and bassist/singer Tobin Watkinson began writing and recording songs together in 2000. The band would later add Drummer Daniel Boutin and guitarist/singer Eric Hoskin to complete its line-up. The band honed its "Beatles-meets-Costello-meets-Weezer sound" both locally and regionally before eventually signing a record deal with the Chicago-based label Downfall and a distribution agreement with the local imprint Sunset Alliance. In mid-2002, the band released their second EP, What the Hell Is Rock n' Roll?, and spent the rest of the year touring with acts like Superdrag and Ben Kweller and working on their first album.

Discography

References

External links
 Sunset Alliance Records

Rock music groups from Arizona
Musical groups from Tucson, Arizona